The 2009 China Masters Super Series was a top level badminton competition which was held from September 15, 2009 to September 20, 2009 in Changzhou, China. It was the seventh BWF Super Series competition on the 2009 BWF Super Series schedule. The total purse for the event was $250,000.

Men's singles

Seeds
 Lee Chong Wei
 Chen Jin
 Peter Gade
 Lin Dan
 Joachim Persson
 Park Sung Hwan
 Boonsak Ponsana
 Wong Choong Hann

Results

Women's singles

Seeds
 Zhou Mi
 Wang Lin
 Tine Rasmussen
 Wang Yihan
 Lu Lan
 Xie Xingfang
 Pi Hongyan
 Wang Chen

Results

Men's doubles

Seeds
 Jung Jae-Sung / Lee Yong-Dae
 Cai Yun / Fu Haifeng
 Choong Tan Fook / Lee Wan Wah
 Gan Teik Chai / Tan Bin Shen
 Chen Hung Ling / Lin Yu Lang
 Chan Chong Ming / Chew Choon Eng
 Guo Zhendong / Xu Chen
 Cho Gun-Woo / Yoo Yeon-Seong

Result

Women's doubles

Seeds
 Cheng Shu / Zhao Yunlei
 Ha Jung-Eun / Kim Min-Jung
 Du Jing / Yu Yang
 Pan Pan / Tian Qing
 Ma Jin / Wang Xiaoli
 Yang Wei / Zhang Jiewen
 Gao Ling / Wei Yili
 Zhang Dan / Zhang Zhibo

Results

Mixed doubles

Seeds
 Lee Yong-Dae / Lee Hyo-jung
 He Hanbin / Yu Yang
 Xie Zhongbo / Zhang Yawen
 Yohan Hadikusumo Wiratama / Chau Hoi Wah
 Shen Ye / Ma Jin
 Songphon Anugritayawon / Kunchala Voravichitchaikul
 Yoo Yeon-Seong / Kim Min-Jung
 Chen Zhiben / Zhang Jinkang

Results

References

External links
China Masters Super Series 2009 at tournamentsoftware.com

China Masters
China Masters Super Series, 2009
China Masters